Badgall (meaning Calla's dwelling) is a hamlet in the parish of Laneast, Cornwall, England, United Kingdom.

References

External links

Hamlets in Cornwall